Aspergillus monodii is a coprophilic species of fungus in the genus Aspergillus which has been isolated from an arid zone in Africa.

References

Further reading 
 

monodii
Fungi described in 2011